USS Munaires (ID-2197) was a cargo ship that served in the United States Navy from 1918 to 1919.

SS Munaires was built as a commercial cargo ship at Newport News, Virginia, by Newport News Shipbuilding and Drydock Company for the Munson Steamship Line of New York City. She was delivered to the Munson Steamship Line on 5 January 1918, but the United States Shipping Board acquired her from Munson on 10 January 1918 for World War I service. On 14 January 1918, the Shipping Board transferred her to the U.S. Navy, which assigned her the naval registry Identification Number (Id. No.) 2197 and commissioned her the same day as USS Munaires.

Assigned to the Naval Overseas Transportation Service, Munaires departed New York City on 27 January 1918 in convoy for Europe, arriving at Bordeaux, France, on 17 February 1918 to discharge her cargo of United States Army supplies. Clearing Gironde, France, on 24 April 1918, she returned to the United States East Coast, arriving at New York City on 7 May 1918.

Munaires made four more round-trip runs to French ports with U.S. Army materials, mostly corn and blankets, the last of these voyages ending at New York City on 20 December 1918.

On 7 January 1919, Munaires got underway for South America, stopping along the way at Hampton Roads, Virginia, to load coal. Arriving at La Plata, Argentina, on 12 February 1919, she unloaded her cargo and steamed back to New York City, which she reached on 4 April 1919. On 6 April 1919 Munaires was decommissioned. The Navy transferred her to the United States Shipping Board on 25 April 1919 for return to the Munson Steamship Line.

Once again SS Munaires, she operated for the Munson Steamship Line in commercial service until she was torpedoed and sunk during World War II on 28 September 1942.

Notes

References

Department of the Navy: Naval Historical Center Online Library of Selected Images:  U.S. Navy Ships: USS Munaires (ID # 2197), 1918–1919. Originally, and later, S.S. Munaires (American Freighter, 1917).
NavSource Online: Section Patrol Craft Photo Archive: Munaires (ID 2197)

World War I cargo ships of the United States
Ships built in Newport News, Virginia
1917 ships
Mundelta-class cargo ships